Răzvan Gabriel Marin (born 23 May 1996) is a Romanian professional footballer who plays as a midfielder for Italian  club Empoli, on loan from Cagliari, and the Romania national team.

He began his senior career with local club Viitorul Constanța at age 17, quickly establishing himself as a first-team regular. His performances earned him a move to Standard Liège at the start of 2017, where he won the Belgian Cup in his first year. Two and a half seasons later, Marin transferred to Dutch team Ajax for a reported fee of €12.5 million, but did not impose himself and moved to Cagliari on an initial loan.

Marin made his debut with the Romania senior team in 2016, after having previously represented the country at several youth levels.

Club career

Early career / Viitorul Constanța
Born in Bucharest, Marin started playing football at the age of six with local Pro Luceafărul, and joined the academy of Viitorul Constanța seven years later. He made his professional debut for the latter club on 18 October 2013, in a 0–4 Liga I away loss to Steaua București.

Marin scored his first league goal in a 2–1 away victory over CFR Cluj, on 15 March 2015. In December 2016, aged only 20, daily newspaper Gazeta Sporturilor announced that he came third for the 2016 Romanian Footballer of the Year award. During his spell in Constanța, Marin amassed competitive totals of 85 games and ten goals.

Standard Liège
On 20 January 2017, Marin signed a four-and-a-half-year contract with Belgian side Standard Liège. Romanian press had initially reported the transfer value at €2.4 million, with Viitorul retaining undisclosed interest on the capital gain of a potential future transfer. He made his first Belgian First Division A appearance two days later, coming on as an 80th-minute substitute in a 0–3 loss to Club Brugge at the Stade Maurice Dufrasne.

On 8 April 2017, Marin scored his first goal for Les Rouches in a 2–2 league draw with Sint-Truiden. On 20 September, he netted once and also provided an assist in a 4–0 victory over Heist for the Belgian Cup; in December, he scored in league fixtures against Waasland-Beveren, Sint-Truiden and Kortrijk respectively. On 3 February 2018, Marin scored the final goal of a 3–0 success over Lokeren only two minutes after replacing Gojko Cimirot. One month later, he assisted all of his team's goals as they won 3–2 against Mechelen, a home game where he also missed a late penalty. On 17 March, he was a starter in the 1–0 win for the Belgian Cup Final against Genk.

Standard played league winner Club Brugge in the Belgian Super Cup on 22 July 2018, with Marin being once again in the starting eleven, however his team lost the match 1–2. He recorded his first European appearance for Standard in the UEFA Champions League's third qualifying round 2–2 home draw with Dutch side Ajax, on 7 August. Marin then played all six matches in the group stage of the UEFA Europa League, as his team finished third behind Sevilla and FC Krasnodar. Marin's good display throughout the year earned him the Romanian Footballer of the Year award at the 2018 Gala Fotbalului Românesc, on 3 December. On the 21st that month, he finished second for the same trophy awarded by the Gazeta Sporturilor newspaper. Marin netted the first goal of 2019 on 3 February, in an eventual 2–1 victory against rivals Anderlecht.

Ajax
On 4 April 2019, it was announced that Ajax signed Marin on a five-year deal for a reported transfer fee of €12.5 million, with the player due to join the squad in the summer. At the time, the sum was the third-highest ever paid by the Dutch club.

Cagliari
On 31 August 2020, Marin joined Italian Serie A club Cagliari on loan with an obligation to buy. On 1 July 2021, the deal was made permanent and Marin signed a contract that would keep him at the team until 2024. The club paid €10 million for the full transfer.

In the first game of the 2021–22 season, he opened up the scoring in an eventual 3–1 win in the Coppa Italia against Pisa.

Loan to Empoli
On 5 July 2022, Marin joined Empoli on a season-long loan with an option to buy.

International career
In September 2016, 20-year-old Marin was selected in Romania's senior squad for the 2018 FIFA World Cup qualifier against Montenegro. On 8 October, for the same competition, he earned his first cap and scored a goal in a 5–0 away victory over Armenia.

Style of play
Marin is usually deployed as either a central or a defensive midfielder, although he is also capable of playing in a more advanced position as an attacking midfielder.

Personal life
Marin's father, Petre, was also a Romanian international. A full-back, he played for Steaua București and Național București among others.

Career statistics

Club

International

Scores and results list Romania's goal tally first, score column indicates score after each Marin goal.

Honours

Viitorul Constanta
Liga I: 2016–17

Standard Liège
Belgian Cup: 2017–18
Belgian Super Cup runner-up: 2018

Ajax
 Johan Cruyff Shield: 2019

Individual
Gazeta Sporturilor Romanian Footballer of the Year runner-up: 2018; third place: 2016
Gala Fotbalului Românesc Romanian Footballer of the Year: 2018

References

External links

1996 births
Living people
Footballers from Bucharest
Romanian footballers
Association football midfielders
Liga I players
FC Viitorul Constanța players
Belgian Pro League players
Standard Liège players
Eredivisie players
AFC Ajax players
Serie A players
Cagliari Calcio players
Empoli F.C. players
Romania youth international footballers
Romania under-21 international footballers
Romania international footballers
Romanian expatriate footballers
Expatriate footballers in Belgium
Expatriate footballers in the Netherlands
Expatriate footballers in Italy
Romanian expatriate sportspeople in Belgium
Romanian expatriate sportspeople in the Netherlands
Romanian expatriate sportspeople in Italy